Adrian Shaw (born 2 January 1947 in Hampstead, North London), frequently known as Ade Shaw, is a musician primarily working in the psychedelic field. He has a long history dating back to the 1960s working with such acts as Hawkwind, Country Joe McDonald, Arthur Brown, and the Deviants.  Shaw played bass for former Tyrannosaurus Rex percussionist Steve Peregrin Took's band in 1974 and three years later, while appearing with Hawkwind on the former other half of Tyrannosaurus Rex Marc Bolan's TV show, was himself invited to join T.Rex; however Bolan's death very shortly thereafter prevented this.

Shaw co-founded Magic Muscle, and since 1990 has been a member of British psychedelic outfit the Bevis Frond. He has also recorded many albums as a solo artist and co-run the independent record label Woronzow Records with Bevis Frond's Nick Saloman. Since 2011 Shaw has also been a member of the band Hawklords.

References

Psychedelic artists
English rock bass guitarists
Male bass guitarists
Hawkwind members
1947 births
Living people
People from Hampstead